Margareth Montão (born 19 July 1971) is a Brazilian handball player.

She was born in São Paulo, Brazil. She competed at the 2004 Summer Olympics, where Brazil placed 7th.

References

1971 births
Living people
Handball players from São Paulo
Brazilian female handball players
Olympic handball players of Brazil
Handball players at the 2000 Summer Olympics
Handball players at the 2004 Summer Olympics
Handball players at the 2003 Pan American Games
Pan American Games medalists in handball
Pan American Games gold medalists for Brazil
Medalists at the 2003 Pan American Games
21st-century Brazilian women